Niculae Flocea (born June 5, 1987) is a Romanian sprint canoer who has competed since 2007. He won a bronze medal in the C-4 500 m event at the 2007 ICF Canoe Sprint World Championships  in Duisburg.

Flocea also finished fourth in the C-2 1000 m event at the 2008 Summer Olympics in Beijing.

References

Sports-reference.com profile

1987 births
Canoeists at the 2008 Summer Olympics
Living people
Olympic canoeists of Romania
Romanian male canoeists
ICF Canoe Sprint World Championships medalists in Canadian